On Expenses is a 2010 British television film directed by Simon Cellan Jones and starring Anna Maxwell Martin as Heather Brooke and Brian Cox as Michael Martin.

The film documents the true story of American journalist Heather Brooke's attempt to get expenses claims of Members of Parliament released under the Freedom of Information Act 2000 and Speaker Michael Martin's battle to prevent it.

Heather Brooke herself appeared in the production in a non-speaking role playing the part of an unnamed MP sitting on the government benches in a scene where Michael Martin is elected to the position of Speaker of the House of Commons.

Cast

References

External links
 BBC Four Programmes – On Expenses
 

2010s political drama films
2010 television films
2010 films
BBC television docudramas
British political drama films
Films directed by Simon Cellan Jones
2010s British films
British drama television films